Laima Zilporytė (born 5 April 1967 in Mediniai) is a retired female cyclist, who trained at Dynamo sports society in Panevėžys and represented the USSR at the 1988 Summer Olympics in Seoul, South Korea. There she won the bronze medal in the women's individual road race, after being defeated in the sprint by the Netherlands' Monique Knol and West Germany's Jutta Niehaus.

References

External links
 databaseOlympics

1967 births
Living people
Soviet female cyclists
Lithuanian female cyclists
Cyclists at the 1988 Summer Olympics
Cyclists at the 1992 Summer Olympics
Olympic cyclists of the Soviet Union
Olympic cyclists of Lithuania
Olympic bronze medalists for the Soviet Union
Dynamo sports society athletes
People from Panevėžys County
Olympic medalists in cycling
UCI Road World Champions (women)
Medalists at the 1988 Summer Olympics